KZEZ (1490 AM) is a radio station licensed to serve the community of Santa Clara, Utah. The station is owned by Tri-Star Media, LLC and airs an oldies music format.

The station was assigned the KZEZ call letters by the Federal Communications Commission on September 26, 2017.

References

External links
Official Website

ZEZ
Radio stations established in 2019
2019 establishments in Utah
Oldies radio stations in the United States
Washington County, Utah